Paulo Edson Nascimento Costa or Tinga (born 15 May 1981) is a Brazilian football right full back who plays for Ferroviário. He started his career in Brasil, at Santos FC and at Aris Thessaloniki F.C.

References

External links
 

1981 births
Living people
Brazilian footballers
Cypriot First Division players
Veranópolis Esporte Clube Recreativo e Cultural players
Esporte Clube Cruzeiro players
Santos FC players
Aris Thessaloniki F.C. players
APOP Kinyras FC players
AEP Paphos FC players
Ferroviário Atlético Clube (CE) players
Brazilian expatriate footballers
Expatriate footballers in Cyprus
Expatriate footballers in Greece
Association football defenders
Footballers from Porto Alegre